Adda Gleason (December 19, 1888 – February 6, 1971) was an American actress and writer.

On Broadway, Gleason portrayed Charlotte in The Dust Heap (1924).

Gleason was born in Chicago, Illinois.  She starred in the 1916 film adaptation of Ramona.  She died in Los Angeles, California.

In addition to her acting, Gleason wrote for some newspapers in the western United States, including the Morning Journal in Albuquerque.

Selected filmography
 To Be Called For (1914)
 The Livid Flame (1914)
 Ramona (1916)
 The Voice in the Fog (1916)
 The Spirit of '76 (1917)
 Fanatics (1917)
 That Devil, Bateese (1918)
 The Thunderbolt (1919)
 How Baxter Butted In (1925)
 The Old Soak (1926)
 Man Bait (1927)
 The College Coquette (1929)

References

External links

 

1888 births
1971 deaths
American film actresses
Actresses from Chicago
American silent film actresses
20th-century American actresses
Broadway theatre people